Shahaduzzaman is a Bangladesh Jamaat-e-Islami politician and the former Member of Parliament of Bogra-2.

Career
Shahaduzzaman was elected to parliament from Bogra-2 as a Bangladesh Jamaat-e-Islami candidate in 1991.

References

Bangladesh Jamaat-e-Islami politicians
Living people
5th Jatiya Sangsad members
Year of birth missing (living people)